Acanthodactylus guineensis, commonly called the Guinea fringe-fingered lizard, is a species of lizard in the family Lacertidae. The species is endemic to West Africa and Central Africa.

Geographic range
A. guineensis is found in Burkina Faso, Cameroon, Central African Republic, Ghana, Mali, Niger, and Nigeria.

Reproduction
A. guineensis is oviparous.

References

Further reading
Boulenger GA (1887). "Descriptions of new Reptiles and Batrachians in the British Museum (Natural History).—Part III". Annals and Magazine of Natural History, Fifth Series 20: 50–53. (Eremias guineensis, new species, p. 51).
Salvador, Alfredo (1982). "A revision of the lizards of the genus Acanthodactylus (Sauria: Lacertidae)". Bonner Zoologische Monographien (16): 1–167. (Acanthodactylus guineensis, new combination, pp. 77–80, Figures 36–38, Map 15). (in English, with an abstract in German).
Trape, Jean-François; Trape, Sébastien; Chirio, Laurent (2012). Lézards, crocodiles et tortues d'Afrique occidentale et du Sahara. Paris: IRD Orstom. 503 pp. . (in French).

Acanthodactylus
Lacertid lizards of Africa
Fauna of Burkina Faso
Reptiles of Cameroon
Reptiles of the Central African Republic
Fauna of Ghana
Fauna of Mali
Reptiles of West Africa
Reptiles of Nigeria
Reptiles described in 1887
Taxa named by George Albert Boulenger